Coylet is a hamlet in Argyll and Bute, Scotland.

Coylet may also refer to:

Ships

SS Coylet a ship that was scuttled off Sand Key Lighthouse, Florida, United States, on 15 February 1922.